Pseudodeltote brunnea is a species of moth of the family Noctuidae first described by John Henry Leech in 1889. It is found on the Japanese islands of Hokkaido, Honshu, Shikoku and Kyushu.

The length of the forewings is 9–11 mm. The forewings are ochreous white, sprinkled and suffused with red brown and the hindwings are white sprinkled with brown.

References

Moths described in 1889
Acontiinae
Moths of Japan